The following deaths of notable individuals related to American television occurred in 2014.

January

February

March

April

May

June

July

August

September

October

November

December

See also
2014 in American television
Deaths in 2014

References

2014 deaths
2014 in American television
Lists of deaths in American television
2014